Monica Riley (1926 – October 11, 2013) was an American scientist who contributed to the discovery of messenger RNA in her Ph.D work with Arthur Pardee, and was later a pioneer in the exploration and computer representation of the Escherichia coli genome.

Career 
After graduating from Smith College with a chemistry degree in 1947, she studied Biochemistry at University of California Berkeley with Pardee. Her Ph.D. work, together with the PaJaMo experiment, ruled out ribosomes as carriers of information to synthesize protein, leading to the discovery of messenger RNA.  After holding faculty positions at University of California Davis and Stony Brook University, she moved to the Marine Biological Laboratory in Woods Hole, staying there until age 80.

As a senior scientist at MBL she was one of the four founding faculty members of the Josephine Bay Paul Center for Comparative Molecular Biology and Evolution led by Mitchell Sogin.  During this time, she co-founded the EcoCyc database of Escherichia coli metabolism, leading the curation of metabolic pathways and genome information for Escherichia coli for over a decade, and developed classification systems for genes and proteins (including MultiFun), which were forerunners of gene ontology.

Selected publications

References

1926 births
2013 deaths
American women biochemists
Smith College alumni
University of California, Berkeley alumni
University of California, Davis faculty
Stony Brook University faculty
American women academics
21st-century American women